Butler County is a county located in the south central portion of the U.S. state of Alabama. As of the 2020 census, the population was 19,051. Its county seat is Greenville. Its name is in honor of Captain William Butler, who was born in Virginia and fought in the Creek War, and who was killed in May 1818.

History
Butler County was formed from Conecuh County, Alabama, and Monroe County, Alabama, by an act passed December 13, 1819, by the Legislature while in session at Huntsville.  This was the first session of the Legislature of Alabama as a State.  The name of Fairfield was first proposed for this county, but was changed on the passage of the bill to Butler, in honor of Captain William Butler.

The precise date of the first settlement made by whites in Butler County is unclear. Some have it as early as 1814, but the earliest settler of no dispute is James K. Benson, who settled in the Flat in 1815, where he built a log house near the current location of Pine Flat Methodist Church. He was soon followed by William Ogly and John Dickerson and their families, who settled on the Federal Road, some 3 miles (5 km) south of where later Fort Dale was built.  In the fall of 1816, a group of people from Georgia settled in a tent camp in Pine Flat, and the year after, another group settled near Fort Dale.

Geography
It is located in the Gulf Coastal Plain region of the state.

Major highways
 Interstate 65
 U.S. Highway 31
 State Route 10
 State Route 106
 State Route 185
 State Route 245
 State Route 263

Adjacent counties
Lowndes County (north)
Crenshaw County (east)
Covington County (southeast)
Conecuh County (southwest)
Monroe County (west)
Wilcox County (northwest)

Demographics

2020 census

As of the 2020 United States census, there were 19,051 people, 6,506 households, and 4,331 families residing in the county.

2010 census
As of the 2010 United States census, there were 20,947 people living in the county. 54.4% were White, 43.4% Black or African American, 0.8% Asian, 0.3% Native American, 0.2% of some other race and 0.8% of two or more races. 0.9% were Hispanic or Latino (of any race).

2000 census
As of the census of 2000, there were 21,399 people, 8,398 households, and 5,870 families living in the county.  The population density was 28 people per square mile (11/km2).  There were 9,957 housing units at an average density of 13 per square mile (5/km2).  The racial makeup of the county was 58.38% White, 40.81% Black or African American, 0.21% Native American, 0.16% Asian, 0.05% from other races, and 0.39% from two or more races.  0.67% of the population were Hispanic or Latino of any race.

There were 8,398 households, out of which 32.50% had children under the age of 18 living with them, 47.70% were married couples living together, 18.20% had a female householder with no husband present, and 30.10% were non-families. 27.50% of all households were made up of individuals, and 13.50% had someone living alone who was 65 years of age or older.  The average household size was 2.52 and the average family size was 3.06.

In the county, the population was spread out, with 26.90% under the age of 18, 8.60% from 18 to 24, 25.10% from 25 to 44, 23.00% from 45 to 64, and 16.40% who were 65 years of age or older.  The median age was 38 years. For every 100 females there were 88.00 males.  For every 100 females age 18 and over, there were 82.90 males.

The median income for a household in the county was $24,791, and the median income for a family was $30,915. Males had a median income of $28,968 versus $18,644 for females. The per capita income for the county was $15,715.  About 20.40% of families and 24.60% of the population were below the poverty line, including 31.30% of those under age 18 and 28.60% of those age 65 or over.

Education 
Butler County contains one public school district. There are approximately 3,000 students in public PK-12 schools in Butler County.

Districts 
School districts include:

 Butler County School District

Government
The last Democrat to win the county in a presidential election is Bill Clinton, who won it by a plurality in 1996.

Communities

City
 Greenville (county seat)

Towns

 Georgiana
 McKenzie

Unincorporated communities

 Bolling
 Chapman
 Forest Home
 Garland
 Industry
 Pine Flat
 Saucer
 Spring Hill
 Wald

Notable people
William Butler, militiaman during the Creek War
Hilary A. Herbert, Secretary of the Navy under President Grover Cleveland
Robert Scothrup Lee, farmer and Confederate veteran
William Lee, politician, judge, and militia officer
Warren A. Thompson, explorer
Hank Williams, country singer
Earnie Shavers, hardest hitting heavyweight boxer
Janie Shores, Alabama Supreme Court justice

See also
National Register of Historic Places listings in Butler County, Alabama
Properties on the Alabama Register of Landmarks and Heritage in Butler County, Alabama

References

External links
 The Greenville Advocate
 Butler County Clerk of Court
 The South Alabama News
 The Greenville Standard

 

 
1819 establishments in Alabama
Populated places established in 1819